Sharon is a town in Hillsborough County, New Hampshire, United States. The population was 359 at the 2020 census. It is home to the Sharon Arts Center, part of the New Hampshire Institute of Art.

History
It was first settled in 1738 as part of "Peterborough Slip", an area which until 1768 included Temple. In 1777, it petitioned to become part of Peterborough, but was denied. It was called "Sliptown" until 1791, when it was incorporated as Sharon. It took its name from Sharon, Connecticut, from which many settlers originated.

The topography is uneven and, in parts, mountainous. In 1823, the population was 400. By 1859, when the population was 229, the town had three sawmills. The principal occupation, however, was farming.

Geography
The town is drained by several branches of the Contoocook River, which rise near the southeast corner of the town. Temple Mountain forms the eastern boundary of Sharon for several miles.

Adjacent municipalities 
 Peterborough (north)
 Temple (east)
 New Ipswich (southeast)
 Rindge (southwest)
 Jaffrey (west)

Demographics

As of the census of 2000, there were 360 people, 138 households, and 113 families residing in the town.  The population density was 24.7 people per square mile (9.5/km).  There were 159 housing units at an average density of 10.9 per square mile (4.2/km).  The racial makeup of the town was 96.94% White, 0.56% African American, 0.56% Native American, 1.11% Asian, and 0.83% from two or more races. Hispanic or Latino of any race were 0.28% of the population. 24.8% were of English, 17.4% Irish, 6.4% French Canadian, 6.0% Italian, 5.7% Finnish, 5.7% French and 5.4% Polish ancestry according to Census 2000.

There were 138 households, out of which 37.0% had children under the age of 18 living with them, 73.2% were married couples living together, 5.8% had a female householder with no husband present, and 18.1% were non-families. 14.5% of all households were made up of individuals, and 3.6% had someone living alone who was 65 years of age or older.  The average household size was 2.61 and the average family size was 2.88.

In the town, the population was spread out, with 24.4% under the age of 18, 5.6% from 18 to 24, 27.5% from 25 to 44, 31.4% from 45 to 64, and 11.1% who were 65 years of age or older.  The median age was 41 years. For every 100 females, there were 129.3 males.  For every 100 females age 18 and over, there were 117.6 males.

The median income for a household in the town was $66,250, and the median income for a family was $75,325. Males had a median income of $51,071 versus $29,375 for females. The per capita income for the town was $29,478.  About 1.8% of families and 3.8% of the population were below the poverty line, including none of those under age 18 and 7.3% of those age 65 or over.

Notable people 

 P. J. O'Rourke (1947–2022), political satirist and journalist
 Erazim Kohák (1933–2020), educator, philosopher, writer 
 Gustavus Swan (1787–1860), politician, jurist, banker

References

External links
 
 New Hampshire Economic and Labor Market Information Bureau Profile

Towns in Hillsborough County, New Hampshire
Towns in New Hampshire